Global Partners in Care (GPIC), formerly known as The Foundation for Hospices in Sub-Saharan Africa (FHSSA), is a 501(c)(3) charitable organization by a group of internationally recognized hospice and HIV/AIDS care professionals to generate support for African organizations that provide hospice and palliative care to those who are dying of HIV/AIDS and other serious diseases. GPIC now works with partners around the globe enhance access, further research and education goals, and raise awareness of the crucial need for palliative care.

External links 
 Hospice Foundation
 Center for Hospice Care
 African Palliative Care Association

HIV/AIDS in Africa
Health charities in the United States
Hospices
Charities based in Indiana
Medical and health organizations based in Indiana